Euler is a German surname. Notable people with the surname include:

 Leonhard Euler (1707–1783), Swiss mathematician and physicist
 Carl Euler (1834–1901), Swiss ornithologist
 Hans Heinrich Euler (1901–1941), German physicist
 Johann Euler (1734–1800), Swiss-Russian astronomer and mathematician
 Ulf von Euler (1905–1983), Swedish physiologist, pharmacologist and Nobel laureate
 Hans von Euler-Chelpin (1873–1964), Swedish biochemist and Nobel laureate
 August Euler (1868–1957), German pioneer aviator
 William Daum Euler (1875–1961), Canadian politician

German-language surnames
Occupational surnames